Condo is an American sitcom television series that aired on ABC from February 10 to June 9, 1983. The series stars McLean Stevenson and Luis Ávalos as the fathers of two families who move into condominium units next to each other. Sheldon Bull created the series, which was executive produced by Paul Junger Witt, Tony Thomas, and John Rich. Saul Turteltaub and Bernie Orenstein were also producers.
 
This was the fourth sitcom to star McLean Stevenson since leaving M*A*S*H, all of them premiering while that series was still on.

Synopsis
James Kirkridge (Stevenson) was a middle-aged insurance salesman who was experiencing a gradual reversal in finances, so much that he and his wife Kiki (Brooke Alderson) had to put their rambling, palatial house in the suburbs up for sale, and downsize. Jesus "Jessie" Rodriguez (Avalos), a native of the Los Angeles barrio, had recently become successful as the owner of a landscaping business, enabling him and his wife Maria (Yvonne Wilder) to trade up to a more upscale neighborhood. Both couples ended up purchasing condominium units right outside a quaint Los Angeles-area fairway, and became each other's next-door neighbors. The white-bread Kirkridges at first mistook the Rodriguezes as the groundskeepers, but when Jessie informed them that he and his clan were in fact owners of the condo next door, wariness and bigotry ensued, mainly between staunch traditionalist James, a WASP, and the hot-headed, Roman Catholic Jessie, who had no patience for out-of-touch whites. Kiki, slightly daffy but strong enough to keep James from stepping out of line, was a little more accepting of her Hispanic neighbors, but found culture shock causing occasional friction between her and feisty Maria especially.

Before James and Kiki could accept that a Hispanic family could gentrify into a neighborhood such as theirs, both families would soon have to deal with another challenge. Shortly after the families moved in, the eldest Kirkridge child, college student Scott (Mark Schubb), and the Rodriguezes' daughter, law student Linda (Julie Carmen), became smitten with each other and started dating—unbeknownst to their families. In the series' second episode, the young couple had returned from a secret elopement in Las Vegas, and soon informed everyone that, in addition to having been married, that Linda was expecting Scott's child. This further added to the uproar on both sides, but the Kirkridges and Rodriguezes agreed that having the baby be born in wedlock was best; in episode three, the Rodriguezes held a proper wedding for Scott and Linda in their Catholic church. The families tried to resolve their differences for the sake of their children and incoming grandchild; with James and Jessie's constant clashing over ideals and social attitudes, however, it was going to be a long process.

Completing the families were preteen Billy Kirkridge (Marc Price), James and Kiki's youngest son, and Maria's father, Jose Montoya (James Victor), who lived in the Rodriguez household. The Rodriguezes also had a son, Miguel, who was enlisted in the Marines and was thus never seen. Grandfather Jose was bold enough to demolish a portion of the wall that separated both families' condo units, and everyone reluctantly agreed to his idea of putting a doorway in, so that all would have central access to the impending grandchild's nursery (in a valiant attempt to improve relations). James was especially displeased with the conversion, as he was quite content in keeping the room as his study. In episode four, Scott and Linda's baby boy, Joselito, was born, and his presence in the central nursery slowly brought the families closer together—but not without the steady stream of racial and religious jokes still flying around.

Cast
McLean Stevenson as James Kirkridge
Brooke Alderson as Kiki Kirkridge
Luis Ávalos as Jesus "Jessie" Rodriguez
Mark Schubb as Scott Kirkridge
Julie Carmen as Linda Rodriguez
Marc Price as Billy Kirkridge 
James Victor as Jose Montoya 
Yvonne Wilder as Maria Rodriguez

US television ratings

Episode list

Broadcast history

Theme music and presentation
The series' theme was "Live and Love it Up", a Latin-style arrangement combined with orchestral portions, arranged by George Aliceson Tipton. The opening lyrics were written by Paul Williams (who also wrote the lyrics for, and co-sang, the theme to another series from Witt/Thomas, It Takes Two, which aired on ABC that same season), with vocals performed by Drake Frye.

In a rare occurrence for a Witt/Thomas series, Condo also featured animation in its opening title. The first animated portion has two moving trucks driving from opposite directions over a map of Los Angeles, and after the trucks collide head-on within a clover-leaf rotary, the map dissolves into the series' title growing from the ground in giant block letters. A Southwestern-style roof appears over the title, and palm trees grow around it. The "N" in "CONDO" opens as if it were a door, and leads into the cast credit procession. The animation appears again at the end of the sequence, as the "N" closes over the last live-action clip (in which both families are posing on and around the Kirkridges' living room couch, similar to how the Tates and Campbells did in the title sequence of Witt/Thomas' Soap). The animation was designed by Donald R. Beck and Patrick Davidson.

Beck and Davidson also produced custom animation that was shown in early ABC promos for the series, in which two hillbilly-like characters are shown arguing over the dividing patio fence in a drawn exterior of the Kirkridge and Rodriguez condos. As ABC voiceover Ernie Anderson narrated, "Not since the Hatfields and the McCoys have there been neighbors like this!", the hillbilly representing Jessie Rodriguez then proceeds to blow up the hillbilly in James Kirkridge's place with dynamite.

Casting
Yvonne Wilder was in reality two years older than James Victor, who was given heavy makeup and a graying beard in order to play Wilder's on-screen father. This sort of casting method was used on the later Witt/Thomas series The Golden Girls, in which Estelle Getty, who played Sophia Petrillo, was given makeup and hair that gave her a much older appearance. In real life, Getty was a year younger than Bea Arthur, who played her daughter, Dorothy Zbornak. In another connection between the two series, McLean Stevenson would later guest star on The Golden Girls as Dorothy's brother-in-law, Ted Zbornak.

About the time he was cast on this series, Marc Price had also been slated for the occasional role of Irwin "Skippy" Handelman on NBC's Family Ties, which had premiered five months before Condo. Price's status on Family Ties enabled him to take regular roles elsewhere. Condo was cancelled by ABC in May 1983, and Price immediately had Family Ties to fall back on. As a result, Price's role as Skippy on Ties was upgraded to that of full-time regular during the 1983–84 season. There was also another connection between these two series, as Brooke Alderson made guest appearances during the first season of Family Ties as Suzanne Davis, as friend of Elyse Keaton (Meredith Baxter-Birney). Alderson, whose second and last appearance on Ties aired shortly after the premiere of Condo, did not appear in the same episodes of Ties as Marc Price.

References
 Brooks, Tim; Marsh, Earle. The Complete Directory to Prime Time Network and Cable TV Shows, Random House, 2003.

External links 
 

1983 American television series debuts
1983 American television series endings
1980s American sitcoms
English-language television shows
American Broadcasting Company original programming
Television shows set in Los Angeles
Television series by Sony Pictures Television
Condominium